Moldes is a surname. Notable people with the surname include:

José Moldes (1785–1824), Argentine military leader
Leandro Moldes (born 1986), Swiss singer